The Bird Spring Group is a geologic group in Nevada. It preserves fossils dating back to the Carboniferous period.

See also

 List of fossiliferous stratigraphic units in Nevada
 Paleontology in Nevada

References
 

Geologic groups of Nevada
Carboniferous System of North America